The Sighiștel is a right tributary of the river Crișul Băița in Romania. It flows into the Crișul Băița in Ștei.

References

External links
 Vladimír Papáč & Jozef Psotka - Drăcoaia Cave in the Sighiștel valley, Bihor Mountains

Rivers of Romania
Rivers of Bihor County